Égletons (Aus Gletons in Occitan) is a commune in the Corrèze department in south-western France.

Geography

Location
Égletons is located in the Massif Central at the crossroads of several geographical ensembles. The city leans up against the first foothills of the Limousine mountains (the Plateau de Millevaches in the north, and the Massif des Monédières to the west), and thus establishes itself on the high Corrèzian plateau and Italicdominating to the east, the gorges of the Dordogne.
The municipality is located on the former Route nationale 89 now the D1089:
 30 km east of Tulle
 29 km west of Ussel
 5 km from Exit 22 of the A89 autoroute connecting Bordeaux (260 kilometres) and Clermont-Ferrand (120 kilometres).

Égletons station has rail connections to Brive-la-Gaillarde, Ussel and Bordeaux.

Climate
The climate is Oceanic, so humid, but with cold winters and hot summers. Snowfall can occur in winter with temperatures often around 0 °C. Summer is sometimes followed by a mild autumn (Indian Summer).

Toponymy
The origin of the name Égletons (1075: from Glutonibus; 1251: from Glotos) is uncertain:
 Man's name glutio, according to M. Villoutreix (in Noms de lieux du Limousin, ed. Hosiery 1998)
 Latin medieval glutis, tenacious earth, clay, with prefix ès rental value, the name of this village pertaining to a muddy place, loamy where no doubt it was established (according to Jean Costes-Revue Lemouzi no 187-July 2008).

History
In 1059 the city was the capital of the family of the Lords of Ventadour.

From their imposing fortress, a veritable eagle's nest on a rocky outcrop whose vestiges (recently restored and consolidated) still bear witness to the power, the Ventadour made the fortune of Égletons, ensured its prosperity and were at the origin of a rich tradition of art and culture, that of the la fin' amor: The Poetry of the Troubadours. Bernard de Ventadour, one of the most famous of them, has been able to sing throughout Europe. Égletons still retains today remnants of this stronghold, its ramparts at the five gates that bear the coat of arms of the Ventadour, its church of St. Antoine and its 12th century steeple armed with machicolations, its chapel of the penitents.

In August 1944, the Battle of Égletons was fought. The fierce fighting, the numerous devastation and the courage of the inhabitants during the struggle for the liberation of the city, earned the medieval capital of the Ventadour, a citation of l'Ordre du Corps d'Armée with the awarding of the Croix de Guerre with silver-gilt star on 11 November 1948.

Population

Economy
Égletons is renowned for its school buildings and public works.
 Lycée Pierre-Caraminot
 L'École d'Application aux métiers des Travaux Publics (EATP)
 Charal, a company specialising in fresh and frozen beef-based products, has a production site.

Heritage

Places and monuments
 The ramparts (remnants).
 The house of d'Ambert de Sérilhac.
 The profession of shoeing the cows.
 L'église Saint-Antoine-l'ermite (steeple (12th-18th century), porch (late 12th century) and stained glass (1956)).
 Chapelle de l'Hôpital (13th century) then of the Brotherhood of the White penitents (17th century)
 Rectory.
 Fountains.
 Centre de Découverte du Moyen Âge (Discovery Centre of the Middle Ages) - heritage of the city of Égletons
 The Town Planning Project of the city of Egletons 1929-1979. In 2009, the Ministry of Culture awarded the city the label, Heritage of 20th Century, for its remarkable architecture and its urban ensemble from the years 1930 to 1960. See: The monumental gate of Stade François Chassaing (René Blanchot, 1936), the l'École Nationale Professionnelle (Robert Danis (architect), 1934), le Bâtiment Central du Village de Vacances (Roland Schweitzer, 1966), les vitraux de l'église (Blanchet and Lesage, 1956) etc.

Parks and green spaces
The commune is a flower town having obtained two flowers on the 2007 list of the Concours des villes et villages fleuris. It retained this recognition in 2008.

History of street names
Paule Morot-Cabanac wrote the book Égletons et ses rues (Égletons and its streets) in which it lists the streets of the city and explains the origin of the names given to them. This is a highly documented book that had required long months of research and preparation for this former history-loving teacher. This book is currently no longer available for sale.

Motto
The motto of the city is "Inania Pello", it means "I reject the vain things"

Notable people
 Bernard de Ventadour (~ 1125-~ 1195), famous troubadour.
 Octave Lacroix (1827-1901), journalist and poet.
 Leonard Louis Bordas (1864-?), an entomologist specialised in the glandular apparatus of Hymenoptera insects, digestive tubes of Orthoptera etc.
 Edmond Vignard (1885-1969), French chemist and archaeologist Prehistorian Egyptologist, he is the namer of the Sebilian culture.
 Charles Spinasse (1893-1979), politician
 Roland Bondonny (1932-2005), poisoner 
 Bertrand Eveno (1944-), senior official and press baron.
 Bernadette Bourzai (1945-), political woman
 Fabien Domingo (1976-), rugby union player
 Thomas Domingo (1985-), rugby union player, brother of the former.
 Jean-Marie Bourre (1945), member of the National Academy of Physicians and former director of INSERM research units of neuro-toxicology and neuro-pharmaco-nutrition.
 Michel Paillassou (1962-2014), engineer, mayor of Egletons, General councillor, President of the community of communes of Ventadour, departmental president of the UMP
 Charles Ferré (1952-), politician UMP, mayor of Egletons (September 2014-),
 Gout Nicolas (1980-), famous troubadour.

See also
Communes of the Corrèze department

References

Communes of Corrèze
Limousin